CWN may refer to:
Canadian Water Network, a water organization in Canada
Catholic World News, online independent news service
Clean Water Network, an American public-policy non-profit organization
CWN (TV station), an Australian television station